The Santiago Channel is a natural drainage channel in Yabucoa, Puerto Rico. It is located in the Playa barrio of Yabucoa, and it forms part of the Guayanés River basin of the Yabucoa Valley.

A bridge of highway route PR-9910 crosses the Santiago Channel.

See also

List of rivers of Puerto Rico

References

External links
 USGS Hydrologic Unit Map – Caribbean Region (1974)

Rivers of Puerto Rico